Infinite is the debut studio album by American rapper Eminem. It was released on November 12, 1996, through Web Entertainment. Recording sessions took place at the Bass Brothers' studio, with production handled by Mr. Porter and Eminem himself. The album features guest vocals from fellow rappers Proof, Mr. Porter, Eye-Kyu, Three, and Thyme, as well as singer Angela Workman.

Physical copies of Infinite were released on cassette and vinyl, and Eminem sold the copies from the trunk of his car in Detroit. It is not officially available on any online music stores and only the title track "Infinite" has been made available on Spotify. On November 17, 2016, five days after the 20th anniversary of the album, Eminem posted a remix of the title track that was remastered, made by the Bass Brothers, to his Vevo channel, releasing it digitally for the first time. Retrospectively, the album received mixed reviews from music critics—it was a commercial failure, selling around 1000 copies. They are highly valued, however, since the album was made before Eminem was signed to Interscope and Aftermath.

Background and recording

In 1992, Eminem signed with FBT Productions, which had been run by Jeff and Mark Bass; they are known as the Bass Brothers. Eminem also held a minimum-wage job that involved cooking and washing dishes at Gilbert's Lodge restaurant in St. Clair Shores for some time.  Inspired by Tupac Shakur's Me Against the World and Nas's Illmatic, Eminem began writing Infinite. After the birth of his daughter Hailie, 23-year-old Eminem headed to the Bass Brothers basement to record the album. The album was completed by the summer of 1996 and was released on Web Entertainment in the fall.

Eminem was encouraged by others for the album, noted to sound like Nas and AZ. Mr. Porter produced the majority of the album, while Proof programmed the drums.

Composition and lyrics
Eminem purposely made Infinites songs "radio-friendly" in hopes of getting played on Detroit radio stations; only around a thousand copies of the album were made. Subjects covered on Infinite included Eminem, him and his grandma's struggle with raising Hailie Jade Mathers, Eminem's newborn daughter, while on limited funds and his strong desire to become rich. After the release of Infinite, Eminem's personal struggles and his abuse of drugs and alcohol resulted in a suicide attempt. Eminem recalled: "Obviously, I was young and influenced by other artists, and I got a lot of feedback saying that I sounded like AZ. Infinite was me trying to figure out how I wanted my rap style to be, how I wanted to sound on the mic and present myself. It was a growing stage. I felt like Infinite was like the demo that just got pressed up."

Release and reception
On November 12, 1996, Infinite was released by Web Entertainment. It's not known exactly how many copies Infinite sold. Eminem stated in his autobiography The Way I Am (2008) that it sold "maybe 70 copies". However, other sources stated that the album sold a few hundred copies or even a thousand copies. Eminem's overall disappointment with Infinites lack of success inspired him to develop his famous Slim Shady alter ego, which became present in his later works.

On May 14, 2009, thisis50.com re-released it for free download on their website to build anticipation for Eminem's sixth studio album Relapse (2009); this was his comeback album. On November 17, 2016, a remix of the album's title track "Infinite" was released in commemoration of the album's 20th anniversary five days after the event. The remix was followed by a documentary about the making of Infinite, also released the same day.

Retrospective reviews of Infinite from music critics were mixed. AllMusic gave it an "Editor Score" of 2.5 out of 5 stars, without a review. Rob Kenner of Complex gave the album a mixed review, saying Eminem "has yet to develop his own distinctive style", and that it was a "competent but unremarkable effort". Mosi Reeves from Rolling Stone stated, that "Probably the most surprising thing on Infinite is hearing [Eminem] rap, 'In the midst of this insanity, I found my Christianity through God' on 'It's O.K.'", noting that spiritual elements had not played a large role in his later works' lyrics. According to Christian hip-hop media outlet Rapzilla, Eminem would pray before shows in the early 2000s. On a 2022 remix of Kanye West's "Use This Gospel", Eminem raps faith-based lines such as "I put all of my trust and faith in You, Father," and "my Savior I call on to rescue me ... He is my shepherd. I'm armed with Jesus, my weapon is prayer."

In a more positive review, Tedd Maider of Consequence of Sound describes Infinite as "a more genuine glimpse of the rapper that is Eminem", and commented that it is "quick-witted and unique rhyming", "lyrical chops, raw style beats, and mentality" could only be matched by his third studio album The Marshall Mathers LP (2000).

Track listing
Track listing and credits taken from album booklet. All songs produced by Mr. Porter, except where noted.

Notes
 signifies a co-producer

Sample credits
 "Tonite" contains a sample of "Let This River Flow" performed by Googie and Tom Cappola.
 "313" contains a sample of "A Secret Place" performed by Grover Washington Jr.
 "Maxine" contains a sample of "Dolphin Dance" performed by Grover Washington, Jr.
 "Open Mic" contains a sample of "Give Me Your Love (Love Song)" performed by Curtis Mayfield, and "World Go Round" performed by Naughty by Nature.
 "Never 2 Far" contains a sample of "Right on Time" performed by Maze.
 "Searchin'" contains a sample of "The Dude" performed by Quincy Jones.
 "Backstabber" contains samples of "Fuckin' Backstabber" performed by Soul Intent,  "Jealous" performed by LL Cool J, and "Get Down" performed by Craig Mack.
 "Jealousy Woes II" contains samples of "Say What" performed by Idris Muhammad, "Jealous" performed by LL Cool J, and "The World Is Yours" performed by Nas.

Personnel
Credits adapted from album booklet.
 Eminem – vocals, production
 Kevin Wilder – mixing, recording
 Robert "Flipside" Handy – mixing, recording
 Mr. Porter – production
 Jeff Bass – executive production
 Mark Bass – executive production
 DJ Butter Fingers – scratches

References

1996 debut albums
Albums produced by Eminem
Albums produced by Mr. Porter
Eminem albums
Web Entertainment albums